Edgaras Matakas (born 23 October 1998) is a Lithuanian Paralympic swimmer. He won bronze in the 50 metre freestyle S11 in 2020.

Matakas became Lithuania's first Paralympic swimmer to win a world title when he won the 50m freestyle S11, he also won a bronze medal in the 100m freestyle S11 at the same championships. He is also a triple European champion at the 2020 World Para Swimming European Championships in Funchal.

References

External links
 

1998 births
Living people
Sportspeople from Kaunas
Lithuanian male freestyle swimmers
Paralympic swimmers of Lithuania
Swimmers at the 2016 Summer Paralympics
Swimmers at the 2020 Summer Paralympics
Medalists at the 2020 Summer Paralympics
Medalists at the World Para Swimming Championships
Medalists at the World Para Swimming European Championships
S11-classified Paralympic swimmers